Pedro Saraiva Gonçalves dos Santos Frazão (born April 27, 1975) is a Portuguese veterinarian and politician for the Chega party.

Since 2022 he has been a member of the Assembly of the Republic representing the  Santarém constituency and is a vice-president of Chega.

Biography

Career
Frazão was born to a military family in Lisbon in 1975. He studied marine biology at the University of Algarve and the Woods Hole Oceanographic Institution in the United States before returning to Portugal to study a course in veterinary medicine. He subsequently worked at a veterinary clinic and for the Portuguese Ministry of Agriculture before founding his own veterinary practice. He has also worked as a part-time teacher of veterinary studies.

Politics
Frazão joined Chega in 2019 and has been the party's spokesman on agriculture. He has stated concerns over taxation policies and farming in Portugal motivated his involvement. In May 2021, he was appointed as a vice-president of the party. In the same year, he was elected as a municipal councilor for Chega in Santarém.

For the 2022 Portuguese legislative election, Frazão contested the Santarém constituency and won a seat. In the Assembly he sits on the committees for agriculture, health and political transparency.

References

1975 births
Living people
Portuguese politicians
People from Lisbon
21st-century Portuguese politicians
Chega politicians
Members of the Assembly of the Republic (Portugal)
Portuguese veterinarians